1976–77 was the 30th season of the Western International Hockey League.

Standings

 Kimberley Dynamiters				56		32	22	 2				253	225		 66
 Cranbrook Royals				56		30	25	 1				272	241		 61
 Spokane Flyers					56		27	29	 0				263	268		 54
 Nelson Maple Leafs 				56		26	29	 1				261	255		 53
 Trail Smoke Eaters	           		56		22	32	 2				227	287		 46

Playoffs

Semi finals

Best of 7

 Spokane Flyers defeated Cranbrook Royals 4 games to 3 (9-6, 5-4, 3-4 OT, 4-2, 3-10, 3-5, 5-1)
 Kimberley Dynamiters defeated Nelson Maple Leafs 4 games to 2 (7-6, 1-6, 4-2, 4-7, 9-2, 5-3)

Final
In the "Best of 7" final series, the Spokane Flyers defeated the Kimberley Dynamiters 4 games to 1 (4-3 2OT, 7-4, 7-2, 2-6, 8-5).
The Spokane Flyers advanced to the 1976-77 Western Canada Allan Cup Playoffs.

References 

Western International Hockey League seasons
WIHL
WIHL